Live is a live album by High Rise, released on October 25, 1994 through P.S.F. Records.

Track listing

Personnel 
Asahito Nanjo – vocals, bass guitar, production
Munehiro Narita – guitar, cover art
Yuro Ujiie – drums

References

External links 
 

1994 live albums
High Rise (band) albums
P.S.F. Records albums